Abel-cheramim (אָבֵל כְּרָמִים ) was a village of the Ammonites, east of Jordan. Jephthah, the judge, victoriously pursued the Ammonites as far as this village.  Also referred to as Abel-keramin. The only reference to this location in the Hebrew Bible is  Judges 11:33. The name means "meadow of the vineyards" or "plain of the vineyards".

References

Attribution

Hebrew Bible places